Lights Come Down is the third EP released by Christian rock band, High Flight Society. It is also the band's final released work. It was released on iTunes under the label, "Caliber Recordings".

Track listing

Personnel 
 Jason Wilkes – lead vocals, rhythm guitar
 Michael Packer – backing vocals, lead guitar
 John Packer – backing vocals, bass guitar
 Scotty Lockridge – drums, percussion

References 

2011 EPs
High Flight Society albums